Minor league baseball teams were based in Ellsworth, Kansas in four seasons between 1905 and 1910. Ellsworth teams played as members of the Class D level 1905 Kansas State League and the Central Kansas League from 1908 to 1910. Ellsworth won league championships in 1905, 1909 and 1910.

History
Ellsworth, Kansas first hosted minor league baseball in 1905. Beginning league play on June 15, 1905, the Ellsworth team won the 1905 Kansas State League championship. Playing as charter members of the Class Class D level league, Ellsworth finished with a 34–15 record under manager Arthur Relihan. In the six–team league, Ellsworth finished 4.5 games ahead on the 2nd place Great Bend Millers (19–9) in the final Kansas State League standings. Following in the standings were the Minneapolis Minnies, (24–22), Hutchinson Salt Miners (22–24), Lincoln Center (11–19) and Kingman/Hoisington (13–34). The Ellsworth franchise folded following the 1905 season and did not return to the 1906 Kansas State League.

In 1908, Ellsworth again hosted minor league baseball when the Ellsworth "Worthies" began play. The Worthies began play as charter members of the six–team Class D level Central Kansas League. The Little River team, McPherson Merry Macks, Minneapolis Minnies, Newton Browns and Salina Trade Winners joined Ellsworth as charter members.

Beginning play on June 22, 1908, the Ellsworth Worthies placed 2nd in the 1908 Central Kansas League. Under manager F.S. Foster, the Worthies finished with a final record of 25–22, ending the season in a 2nd place tie with the Newton Browns. In the final Central Kansas League standings, Ellsworth finished 4.5 games behind the 1st place Minneapolis Minnies.

The 1909 Ellsworth Worthies won the Central Kansas League championship as the league expanded to eight teams. Ellsworth ended the 1909 season with a record of 44–33, placing 1st in the final league standings. With George Seigle as manager, Ellsworth finished 4.5 games ahead of the 2nd place Salina Trade Winners (40–28) in the eight–team league. Following in the standings were the Abilene Red Sox (37–30), Minneapolis Minnies (36–32), Junction City Soldiers (34–32), Beloit (33–36), Clay Center Cubs (32–37) and Manhattan Maroons (16–54).

The team became the Ellsworth Blues in 1910, winning their second consecutive Central Kansas League championship in their final season. The Blues ended the 1910 season with a record of 53–28, placing 1st in the final standings. Richard Ford served as manager as the Blues finished 5.0 games ahead of the Clay Center Cubs (48–33) in the eight–team league standings. The Abilene Reds (44–33), Salina Trade Winners (44–34), Concordia Travelers (43–38), Manhattan Maroons (35–43), Junction City Soldiers (34–48) and Beloit/Chapman (18–62) followed in the final standings.

Despite winning the championship, the Ellsworth Blues franchise folded after the 1910 season, as the Central Kansas League reduced to four teams for the 1911 season.

Ellsworth, Kansas has not hosted another minor league team.

The ballpark
The name of the ballpark of the Ellsworth minor league teams is not known. It was noted adult admission at the Ellsworth ballpark was .25 cents. The ballpark was reportedly located Northeast of Ellsworth and had a capacity of 500.

Timeline

Year–by–year records

Notable alumni
Walt Alexander (1910)
Fred Blanding (1909)
Art Griggs (1905)
Pete Johns (1910)
Wiley Taylor (1910)

See also
Ellsworth Worthies playersEllsworth Blues playersEllsworth (minor league baseball) players

References

External links
Baseball Reference

Defunct minor league baseball teams
Professional baseball teams in Kansas
Baseball teams established in 1908
Baseball teams disestablished in 1909
Defunct baseball teams in Kansas
Central Kansas League teams
Ellsworth County, Kansas